This list of coats of arms bearing the Palatine Lion includes municipal coats of arms as well as other shields and company logos which depict the Palatine Lion.

The Palatine Lion in coats of arms of regional bodies and administrations 

Key to the columns
Status:
Federal state = Federal state of Germany
Former municipality = former independent village parish (Ortsgemeinde)
former prov. = former province (Regierungsbezirk or Bezirk)
Higher ad. = higher level administration (höhere Kommunalverwaltung)
Former co. = former county (Landkreis)
parish = village/town district/parish and other administrative units at village level
VG = collective municipality (Verbandsgemeinde)
Remarks:
Only used where there are variations from the normal design or to links to separate articles

The Palatine Lion in coats of arms of the German Armed Forces

See also 
 Electoral Rhenish Circle

 Wappenbuch des Landkreises Cochem-Zell, Darmstadt 2001, v. Alfons Friderichs,

External links 
 Heidelberg, Western Cape, South Africa

Palatine Lion
Palatine Lion list
Palatine Lioni list
Electoral Palatinate